Francisco de Freytas (16th Century) was a Portuguese conquistador who arrived in the Río de la Plata with the expedition of Pedro de Mendoza. He was chosen along with other conquistadores to negotiate with Charles I of Spain the supply of arms and provisions for the settlers of Buenos Aires.

De Freytas resided in the city of Asuncion, where he was a member of the Cabildo.

References

External links 

portalguarani.com

Spanish colonial governors and administrators
Explorers of Argentina
Explorers of South America
Spanish conquistadors
People from Asunción
People from Buenos Aires
Río de la Plata